Hylocomiaceae is a family of mosses, containing 15 genera:

 Ctenidium
 Hylocomiastrum
 Hylocomium
 Leptocladiella
 Leptohymenium
 Loeskeobryum
 Macrothamnium
 Meteoriella
 Neodolichomitra
 Orontobryum
 Pleurozium
 Puiggariopsis
 Rhytidiadelphus
 Rhytidiopsis
 Schofieldiella

References

External links

Hypnales
Moss families